Big Brother VIP 2022, also known as Big Brother VIP 2 is the current second season of Big Brother VIP, hosted by Arbana Osmani. The season started airing on 24 December 2022 on Top Channel. The whole season, live from the house, can be viewed in two live pay-per-view channels, with the name Big Brother VIP 1 and Big Brother VIP 2, which are available on Albanian television platform DigitAlb. Arbër Hajdari returned as opinionist in the live evictions shows and was joined by Zhaklin Lekatari, replacing Balina Bodinaku. Megi Pojani hosted the spin-off show Big Brother VIP – Fans' Club, replacing Dojna Mema. Ardit Cuni was the new opionist for the spin-off show Fans' Club. A 60-minute radio show Big Brother Radio was introduced this season, with Elona Duro as the host. The show began airing on 13 February 2023, it was available on Top Albania Radio and on My Music on DigitAlb and it aired from Monday to Thursday.

Production
Due to satisfactory ratings of the first season, it was announced a second season of Big Brother VIP, by the executive producers, Lori Hoxha and Sara Hoxha. On 22 February 2022, on the show of Top Channel Ftese ne 5, Arbana Osmani, the presenter of the show said: "Big Brother 2 will come in the end of December" and Lori Hoxha, the producer of the show was asked from the journalist: "Are you ready for the second season?" and then Hoxha said: "Of course."

On 26 June 2022, Lori Hoxha was asked by her followers on the social media Instagram, when will begin Big Brother Vip 2. Hoxha answered "At the end of December, directly after the end of the 2022 FIFA World Cup, that will occupy the screen throughout November and most of December and will have the dedicated space on Top Channel as always [...] But until then, the daily and prime programming will be "on top", so you won't feel the lack too much."

It was reported, that Arbana Osmani, will not be the host of the second season and it was reported that the host, of Për'puthen and Dancing with the Stars, Bora Zemani would be hosting the second season of Big Brother VIP, but on October 2022, the official page of Top Channel on Instagram has published a video with the most spicy moments of the first season, as well as the extraordinary success of the reality show, introducing the name of the moderator: "The program that broke every viewership record, the program that captivated Albanians everywhere, to the point of obsession... Big Brother Vip, with Arbana Osmani, soon on Top Channel". Also on 6 November 2022, Osmani on her interview on the sunday show of Top Channel E Diell said: "I have told the public that I will be in Big Brother VIP. We have had things clear and it is not that I am influenced by what has been written."

On 16 December 2022, Top Channel announced that the show would begin airing on 24 December 2022.

Like in the previous season, the location for the season will be again in the big studio in Tirana with the name Studio Nova, but with changes. The housemates live together in the house, where 24 hours a day their every word and every action is recorded by cameras and microphones in all the rooms in the house.

Housemates
On Day 1, fifteen housemates entered the house during launch. On Day 11, Efi Dhedhes & Mikela Pupa, who played as one housemate, from now on they both play alone as two individual housemates.

Nominations table
 2-in-1 housemate called 'Efi & Mikela', their nominations counted as one. (Week 1)

Notes
 : On Day 4, the viewers voted for their favorite housemate. Zhaklina had the most votes, while Ariana, Armaldo, Efi & Mikela, Gent, Herion and Ronaldo had the fewest votes and were the nominees to be nominated for eviction. The four housemates with the most votes were nominated for eviction.
 : Due to the housemates breaking the rules, Big Brother decided all housemates would be up for elimination.
 : On Day 18, the viewers voted for their favorite housemate. The four housemates with the fewest votes, were up for elimination.
 : Bjordi, Diola, Eni and Nita, as the new housemates had immunity.
 :  Each housemate had to save another housemate through a saving chain. Armaldo began to choose, as he was the Head of Household. Eni, Krist, Olta and Tea were the last housemates standing, as they were not saved, and thus became the nominees.
 :  Efi and Luiz won in a game and send in the Baby Room and were exempt from the saving chain. Also Xhonatan, as the new housemate was exempt from the saving chain.
 : As punishment for sharing information from the outside into the house, Xhonatan was automatically nominated.
 : Valbona, as the new housemate had immunity, but could vote.
 :  Xhonatan was evicted by the public, but he was revealed to have picked the Return Ticket, therefore he went back into the House.
 : On Day 36, Armaldo was being tempted by the Pandora's Box, and he choose to open the box. The good consequence was: 2 VIP Tickets (awarded from Digitalb) for a football match of his choice, while the bad consequence was: he must vote for four housemates, who were not allowed to vote.
 : During the live eviction show, the housemate played a game and the winner had immunity. Bjordi won the game and gave the reward to Diola, so she had immunity.
 : This week, 7 Housemates chosen by a random drawn will vote in a face-to-face vote, while the remaining 6 will cast their vote privately in the Diary Room.
 : On Day 43, Dea Mishel, after winning on a game with questions, Big Brother gave her the power to nominate 3 housemates for elimination. Efi, Kiara and Luiz were the nominees.
 : On Day 43, Krist was being tempted by the Pandora's Box, and he choose to open the box. The good consequence was: to meet his father, while the bad consequence was: all the other housemates where up for elimination.
 : Bledi, Keisi and Tan, as the new housemates had immunity.
 : On Day 46, the viewers voted for their favorite housemate. Armaldo and Luiz had the most votes, and had immunity.
 : On Day 46, Kiara was being tempted by the Pandora's Box, and she choose to open the box. The good consequence was: won two free trip tickets by Savatours to Maldives, while the bad consequence was: Kiara had the power to put on nominations 3 names to get evicted on Saturday, on which the 3 names she chose were: Dea Mishel, Olta and Tea.
 : Beati and Ermiona, as the new housemates had immunity.
 : The viewers voted for their favorite housemate. Luiz and Olta had the most votes and had immunity.
 : As punishment for talking for the nominations, Armaldo, Krist, Luiz and Olta could not vote.
 : This week, 5 Housemates chosen by a random drawn, their nominations counted twice.
 : Olta, after winning in a game, had the power to put 3 housemates up for elimination, on which the 3 housemates she chose were: Bledi, Kiara and Luiz.
 : Due to Bledi's walking from the House on Day 60, the eviction on Day 60 was cancelled.
 :  Each housemate had to save another housemate through a saving chain. Valbona began to choose, as she was the Head of Household. Dea Mishel, Krist and Olta, were the last housemates standing, as they were not saved, and thus became the nominees.
 : Valbona, as the Head of Household, Big Brother gave her the power to save two from the nominees, Dea Mishel, Krist or Olta, or could put more two housemates on nomination. She chose to put also Armaldo and Tan on nomination.
 : Due to Valbona's walking from the House on Day 61, the eviction on Day 64 was cancelled.
 : Beati, Dea Mishel, Kiara, Luiz and Olta, after losing on a game, were automatically nominated.
 : Eva, as the new housemate had immunity.
 : Shpat, as the new housemate had immunity.
 : The viewers voted for their favorite housemate. Dea Mishel, Kiara, Luiz and Olta had the most votes and had immunity, while Armaldo, Ermiona, Keisi, Krist, Nita and Tan had the fewest votes and were the nominees to be nominated for eviction. The three housemates with the most votes were nominated for eviction.
 : On Day 71, Luiz was being tempted by the Pandora's Box, and he choose to open the box. The good consequence was: to meet two friends of him, while the bad consequence was: Luiz had the power to put on nominations 3 housemates to get evicted on Tuesday, on which the 3 names he chose were: Armaldo, Krist and Olta.
 : Antoneta, Fotini, Jori, Sabian and Qetsor, as the new housemates had immunity.
 :  Krist was evicted by the public, but he was revealed to have picked the Return Ticket, therefore he went back into the House.
 :  Each housemate had to save another housemate through a saving chain. Kiara began to choose, as she was the Head of Household. Antoneta, Elvis, Luiz and Shpat, were the last housemates standing, as they were not saved, and thus became the nominees.
 : Due to Armaldo, Krist and Luiz breaking the rules, were automatically nominated.
 : On Day 85, Nita was being tempted by the Pandora's Box, and she choose to open the box. The good consequence was: to meet one friend of her, while the bad consequence was: Nita had the power to put on 2 couples against the public vote, on which the 2 couples she chose were: Kiara & Olta and Krist & Qetsor. The couple with the most votes from the public votes, would be nominated for eviction.
 : Keisi, as the Head of Household had immunity. Also, Lorenc, as the new housemate had immunity.

Nominations totals received 
 2-in-1 housemate called 'Efi & Mikela', their nominations counted as one. (Week 1)

References

External links 
Official Website

VIP02
Albania02
2022 Albanian television seasons
2023 Albanian television seasons